Guillermo García Cantú (born August 24, 1960 in Monterrey, Mexico) is a Mexican actor best known for his work in telenovelas. He began his acting career in 1986 when he was 26.

Filmography

Film

Television

Awards and nominations

External links 
 
 Guillermo García Cantú on Alma Latina

1960 births
Living people
Mexican male film actors
Mexican male stage actors
Mexican male telenovela actors
Male actors from Monterrey
Mexican people of Italian descent